Kanan Jafarov (born on 9 March 2000) is an Azerbaijani footballer who plays as a midfielder for Keşla in the Azerbaijan Premier League.

Club career
On 12 April 2019, Jafarov made his debut in the Azerbaijan Cup for Zira against Qaradag Lokbatan.

On 17 April 2021, Jafarov was called up to the Keshla's main squad for the Premier League match against Sabah.

References

2000 births
Living people
Footballers from Baku
Association football midfielders
Azerbaijani footballers
Shamakhi FK players
Zira FK players
Azerbaijan Premier League players